Jessica Scorpio (born 1987) is a founder and Former Chief Marketing Officer at Getaround, a peer-to-peer carsharing company. Scorpio previously founded IDEAL, a non-profit network for entrepreneurs and young leaders.

Biography
Jessica Scorpio was born in St. Catharines, Ontario, Canada and grew up in Florida. She graduated from Carleton University in 2008 with an Honours Bachelor of Arts degree in Political Science with a concentration on International Relations and a Minor in Business. Along with Sam Zaid and Elliot Kroo, she developed the concept that led to the launch of Getaround and Grand Prize Win at TechCrunch Disrupt New York in May 2011.

Awards and recognition
In August 2011, the Huffington Post picked Scorpio to be on the list of female technology founders to watch. In October 2011, Fortune Magazine recognized Scorpio as being amongst the top eight female entrepreneurs under the age of 25. In November 2011, CEOWorld Magazine included Scorpio on their list of the top 20 groups of female founders and entrepreneurs of technology companies. In December 2011, GE Ecoimagination recognized Scorpio, along with Vinod Khosla and Secretary Steven Chu, as one of 11 Sustainable Innovators of 2011. In February 2012, Business Insider, Inc. highlighted Scorpio as one of the 14 Incredible Women To Watch In Silicon Valley and listed her in the "Silicon Valley 100".

Public speaking
Scorpio is a speaker and panellist who leads discussions about women in business, the future of transportation, sustainable living, and collaborative consumption. She has presented at events such as Google Zeitgeist, TechCrunch Disrupt, Sustainable Brands, and SXSW Interactive.

References

Living people
1987 births
Businesspeople from St. Catharines
Businesspeople from San Francisco
Carleton University alumni